The Kiremitliktepe Ski Jump, or officially Türk Telekom Ski Jumping Towers, is a ski jumping venue located on the Kiremitlik Hill at the base of Palandöken Mountain just southwest of Erzurum in eastern Turkey. Completed in September 2010, the complex consists of a large hill (K-125) and a normal hill (K-95) jumping tower, as well as three additional smaller slopes of K-65, K-40 and K-20 for training purposes and for use by young jumpers.

Design and construction
The construction of the ski jumping center was part of a project of the Ministry of Youth and Sports and the Turkey Ski Federation that was needed for the realization of the 2011 Winter Universiade in Erzurum. The ski jumping facility was designed in modernist style by the Slovene architecture firm Atelje S, partner of the co-contractor MANA Original company from the same country, which won the project's international request for tender along with the Turkish Sarıdağlar construction company in March 2008.

Erzurum is located on a high plateau at  AMSL in Eastern Anatolia Region.

The two Olympic-size towers has cylindrical structures at the top. Atop the main tower, a restaurant is situated. 

The construction, carried out by the Sarıdağlar company, was completed within ten months, and the sport complex opened in September 2010. It cost €20 million. The venue was renamed in January 2011 after the Turkish telecommunications company Türk Telekom, the main sponsor of the 2011 Winter Universiade. Its new name will be lasting until 2016.

2014 landslide
On July 15, 2014, there was a huge landslide on the Kiremitlik Hill with the result that hills were severely damaged. On investigation it was noted that the construction completely lacked foundations, the ski slopes and seating being laid directly onto bare earth. Due to the collapse, the future of the Kiremitliktepe Ski Jump and also of ski jumping in Turkey became doubtful. However, the ski runs were competently rebuilt using proper foundations and the facilities were operating again by 2018, hosting international events.

Facilities

The multi-purpose facility allows organization of ski jumping events at highest level year around. The high-tech ice-ceramic track inruns and plastic matt covered ski-jump landing area enable equal competition conditions in winter season as well as during the rest of the year irrespectively of the weather. The venue has 10,000 spectator capacity.

The complex offers accommodation in the hotel near the large hill and in the bungalows on top of the center, and catering in the restaurant atop the main ski jump tower. There is a gym hall for training, and saunas and massage pools for relaxation. 

Also during the time when no competitions are held, the facility attracts local population and tourists for recreation activities and social events at the hotel restaurant and the restaurant atop the 43m-high tower, which offers a panoramic view of the entire city.

Large hill
The slope for the landing is 34.57°.

Hill record was set with 143.5 m by Matej Dobovsek from Slovenia  at the 2011 Winter Universiade on January 29, 2011.

Normal hill
The normal hill's K-point is 95 and hill size 109. It has a jumping tower of  height. The landing's angle is 34.25°.

Aleksander Zniszczoł from Poland set a hill record with 111.5 m at the FIS Junior World Ski Championships on February 21, 2012. Women's record belongs to Japanese Sara Takanashi with 110.5 m set at same event on the same day.

Events hosted
The first international event, which took place at the Kiremitliktepe Ski Jump, was the FIS Ski Jumping Continental Cup on December 18-19, 2010. The next competition was the Winter Universiade held from January 28 to February 3, 2011. The venue hosted again the FIS Ski Jumping Continental Cup's ski jumping event in December 2011 and Nordic combined event in January 2012. The 2012 FIS Junior World Ski Championships were held at the ski jumping facility from February 22 to 25.

References

Ski jumping in Turkey
Sports venues in Erzurum
Ski jumping venues
Sports venues completed in 2010
2010 establishments in Turkey
Modernist architecture in Turkey
Tourist attractions in Erzurum Province